Alison Sound is a sound in the Central Coast region of British Columbia, Canada.  It extends north and northwest from Belize Inlet, which itself is one of the many sidewaters of Seymour Inlet.  There is no connection in name or geography to Allison Harbour, which is to the southwest.

References

Sounds of British Columbia
Central Coast of British Columbia